Sedi may refer to:

 Sedi Township, Sichuan, China
 Sədi, Azerbaijan